Emmanuel Nii Ashie Moore (born December 26, 1969) is a Ghanaian politician and member of the Sixth Parliament of the Fourth Republic of Ghana representing the Adenta Constituency in the Greater Accra Region on the ticket of the National Democratic Congress.

Personal life 
Moore is a Christian (Assemblies of God Church). He is married.

Early life and education 
Moore was born on December 26, 1969. He hails from Teshie-Accra, a town in the Greater Accra Region of Ghana. He entered European University of Hasselt, Belgium and obtained his Bachelor of Science degree's Business Administration – Marketing in 2003.

Politics 
Moore is a member of the National Democratic Congress (NDC). In 2012, he contested for the Adenta seat on the ticket of the NDC sixth parliament of the fourth republic and won.

Employment 
 Deputy Executive Director, National Service Scheme
 Manager/administrator/HR practitioner

References 

1969 births
Living people
National Democratic Congress (Ghana) politicians
People from Greater Accra Region
Ghanaian MPs 2013–2017
Ghanaian MPs 2017–2021